RockinnReelininAucklandNewZealandXXX is the eighth album overall and the second live album by the American rock band the Cramps. It was released on the band's own Vengeance Records. It was mixed by Greg Heiter and recorded live on August 27, 1986, at the Galaxy in Auckland, New Zealand. The track list was heavily drawn from the album A Date with Elvis (1986, Big Beat), released earlier that year. It was reissued in 2001 with the bonus tracks "Blue Moon Baby", "Georgia Lee Brown" and "Lonesome Town".

Track listing
All tracks composed by Lux Interior and Poison Ivy; except where indicated
 "The Hot Pearl Snatch" – 3:21
 "People Ain't No Good" – 3:18
 "What's Inside a Girl?" – 3:06
 "Cornfed Dames" – 4:49
 "Sunglasses After Dark" (Rosalind Michelle Pullens, Link Wray) – 4:10
 "Heartbreak Hotel" (Mae Boren Axton, Thomas Durden, Elvis Presley) – 3:35
 "Chicken" – 1:37
 "Do the Clam" (Sid Wayne, Ben Weisman, Dolores Fuller) – 2:43
 "Aloha from Hell" – 2:41
 "Can Your Pussy Do the Dog?" – 3:38
 "Birdfeed" (Al Frazier, Harris, Carl White, Turner Wilson) – 4:09

Reissue bonus tracks
 "Blue Moon Baby" (Meridan, Rowe, Satalsk) – 2:43
 "Georgia Lee Brown" (Robert Hafner, Phil Zinn) – 3:21
 "Lonesome Town" (Baker Knight) – 3:37

Personnel
The Cramps
Lux Interior – vocals
Poison Ivy Rorschach – guitar
Candy Del Mar – bass guitar
Nick Knox – drums
Technical
Greg Heiter – sound mix
David Cheppa – remastering
Kent J. Smythe – front cover photography

Notes and references

The Cramps albums
1987 live albums